The Kilkoff House is a historic house located in DeLand, Florida. It is locally significant as one of DeLand's earliest buildings, and also as a good example of vernacular construction that historically underwent modification to suit the needs and tastes of its owners.

Description and history 
Constructed in 1878, and altered up until 1920, the residence is a two-story frame, vernacular building with Classical Revival elements, and a "T" footprint. Built on a foundation of brick piers, the exterior is of horizontal siding, and the cross gable roof is surfaced with asphalt shingles and pierced by one brick chimney. The property contains two non-contributing resources: a swimming pool and a garage.

It was added to the National Register of Historic Places on October 8, 1997.

Gallery

References

Houses on the National Register of Historic Places in Volusia County, Florida
DeLand, Florida
Houses completed in 1878